Mount Conrad is a peak that rises to about ,  south of Cape Kinsey, in the central Goodman Hills in the Wilson Hills. It was mapped by the United States Geological Survey from surveys and from U.S. Navy air photos, 1960–63, and named by the Advisory Committee on Antarctic Names for American aviation figure Max Conrad, who, in January 1970, became the first person to fly an aircraft solo to the South Pole.

References 

Mountains of Oates Land